John Wright's Indian Summers (2007) is a book authored by John Wright describing his experiences as coach of Indian national cricket team. It is co-authored by Indian journalist Sharda Ugra and New Zealand writer Paul Thomas.

External links
Excerpt of book at Sify.com
Review at sportnetwork.net
Review at Outlook India
Customer Review at Amazon

Cricket books
2007 non-fiction books